Joseph Volpe may refer to:

 Joe Volpe (born 1947), Canadian politician
 Joseph Volpe (opera manager) (born 1940), American opera manager and arts management consultant
 Joseph Volpe (physician) (born 1938), American physician and neurologist